Fort Gaines is a city in Georgia, United States, with a population of 1,107 at the 2010 census. The city is the county seat of Clay County.

History
The present town of Fort Gaines was founded in 1816 as protection against the indigenous Creeks and prospered due to riverboat trade. Though it was named for General Edmund Pendleton Gaines, he did not arrive there with the 4th Infantry of the United States Army until 1816. A fort of the same name had been built in 1814 nearby on the Chattachoochee River. In 1854, Fort Gaines was designated seat of the newly formed Clay County.

According to The Floridian newspaper of 1840, in Fort Gaines were the Chattahoochee Female College and the Independent College for Young Men, boarding schools (not colleges, as that word is traditionally used today). "The writer esteems that the society and location of Fort Gaines for literary purposes, so far as the education of youths is concerned, equal to that of Sparta [Georgia]."

Geography
Fort Gaines is located along the western edge of Clay County at  (31.614226, -85.048317). Its western boundary is the Chattahoochee River, which is also the state line with Alabama. Walter F. George Lock and Dam crosses the river between the northern side of Fort Gaines and Alabama, forming Walter F. George Lake, also known as Lake Eufaula.

Georgia State Routes 37, 39, and 266 all run through the city. GA-37 runs east-west just south of the downtown area, leading east  to Edison and west  to Abbeville, Alabama (as Alabama State Route 10). GA-39 runs north-south through the center of town as Hancock Street, leading north  to Georgetown and southeast  to Blakely. GA-266 begins just north of the city and leads northeast  to Cuthbert.

Demographics

2020 census

As of the 2020 United States census, there were 995 people, 336 households, and 212 families residing in the city.

2000 census
At the 2000 census, there were 1,110 people, 429 households and 287 families residing in the city. The racial makeup of the city was 67.93% African American, 31.08% White, 0.18% Native American, 0.18% Asian, 0.09% Pacific Islander, and 0.54% from two or more races. Hispanic or Latino of any race were 1.44% of the population.

There were 429 households, of which 28.2% had children under the age of 18 living with them, 31.2% were married couples living together, 31.9% had a female householder with no husband present, and 33.1% were non-families. 31.0% of all households were made up of individuals, and 14.9% had someone living alone who was 65 years of age or older.  The average household size was 2.45 and the average family size was 3.07.

Age distribution was 28.7% under the age of 18, 8.7% from 18 to 24, 21.0% from 25 to 44, 19.5% from 45 to 64, and 22.0% who were 65 years of age or older. The median age was 39 years. For every 100 females, there were 72.4 males. For every 100 females age 18 and over, there were 65.8 males.

The median household income was $18,30, and the median family income was $20,909. Males had a median income of $20,417 versus $14,875 for females. The per capita income for the city was $12,481. About 34.7% of families and 40.5% of the population were below the poverty line, including 53.2% of those under age 18 and 26.7% of those age 65 or over.

Education

Clay County School District 
The Clay County School District holds pre-school to grade nine, and consists of one elementary school, one middle school, and one ninth-grade education building. The district has 27 full-time teachers and over 358 students.  High school aged students attend 10-12th grade in adjoining Randolph County, Georgia.
Clay County Elementary School
Clay County Middle School
Ninth-Grade Academy

Notable person
Mackey Sasser, baseball player

See also

References

External links
 Founding of Fort Gaines historical marker from the Digital Library of Georgia
 Fort Gaines historical marker
 In the Confederacy historical marker
 Queen City of the Chattahoochee historical marker
 Site of Fort Gaines Female College historical marker
 Mt. Gilead Baptist Church historical marker

Gaines
Cities in Georgia (U.S. state)
Cities in Clay County, Georgia
County seats in Georgia (U.S. state)
Georgia populated places on the Chattahoochee River
Gaines
1816 establishments in Georgia (U.S. state)